Gouverneur Morris II (February 9, 1813 – August 20, 1888) was an American railroad executive and the son of a founding father of the United States, Gouverneur Morris.

Early life

Gouverneur Morris was born on February 9, 1813, Morrisania, Bronx, New York. He was the son of a founding father of the United States, Gouverneur Morris (1752–1816) and his wife, Ann Cary Randolph (1774–1837), nicknamed "Nancy".

Career
Morris was one of the major entrepreneurs of the 19th century Bronx. As Vice President of the New York and Harlem River Railroad, he built the railroad now running along Park Avenue in New York City. In 1840, he donated St. Ann's Church as a family memorial. He promoted Port Morris as a commercial port, and donated land to skilled workers in 1848, to create an ideal workingman’s village if it were called Morrisania. That is today’s Morrisania neighborhood. He spent much of the later part of his career in Vermont, as president of the Vermont Valley Railroad.

He wasn't as active in politics as his famous father, but he was a founder of the Republican Party and attended its opening convention in 1854.

Personal life
He married his first cousin Martha Jefferson Cary, daughter of writer Virginia Randolph Cary (1786–1852). Together they had three children: Gouverneur Morris III (1842–1897); Anne Cary Morris (1847–1926), who married Alfred Percival Maudslay (1850–1931), the British diplomat, explorer and archaeologist; and Peter Randolph Morris (1865–1934), who helped to establish the Overland Stage Line in Denver, Colorado.

After his death on August 20, 1888 in Bartow-on-the-Sound, Pelham, New York, Morris was buried at St. Ann's Episcopal Church in the Bronx.

Descendants
His grandson, Gouverneur Morris IV (1876–1953), was an author of pulp novels and short stories during the early twentieth century. Several of his works were adapted into films, including the famous Lon Chaney film, The Penalty in 1920.

His granddaughter, Henrietta Fairfax Morris, married Stephen Bonsal (1865–1951) a journalist and war correspondent who won the 1945 Pulitzer Prize for History.

His great-grandson, Philip Bonsal (1903–1995), was a diplomat with the U.S. Department of State who served as the United States Ambassador to Cuba from February 1959 until October 1960.

See also
Randolph family of Virginia
List of United States political families

References

External links 
 The Gouverneur Morris, Jr. Papers 1835–1879 at the New York Historical Society

1813 births
1888 deaths
Morris family (Morrisania and New Jersey)
Cary family of Virginia
Randolph family of Virginia
People from the Bronx
New York (state) Republicans
19th-century American railroad executives
American people of Dutch descent
American people of Powhatan descent